More Pay, Less Work is a 1926 American silent comedy film directed by Albert Ray and starring Albert Gran, Mary Brian and Charles "Buddy" Rogers.

Cast
 Albert Gran as Cappy Ricks 
 Mary Brian as Betty Ricks 
 E.J. Ratcliffe as Dad Hinchfield 
 Charles "Buddy" Rogers as Willia Hinchfield 
 Otto Hoffman as Henry Tweedle 
 Heinie Conklin as Janitor

References

Bibliography
 Solomon, Aubrey. The Fox Film Corporation, 1915-1935: A History and Filmography. McFarland, 2011.

External links

1926 films
Silent American comedy films
American silent feature films
1920s English-language films
Fox Film films
Films directed by Albert Ray
American black-and-white films
1926 comedy films
1920s American films